Ann Pelcovits Bartel (born September 15, 1949) is the Merrill Lynch Professor of Workforce Transformation at the Columbia University Graduate School of Business and a Research Associate of the National Bureau of Economic Research. She graduated from the University of Pennsylvania in 1970, and completed her PhD in economics at Columbia University in 1974.

Research 
Bartel's dozens of published papers have included such topics as employee training, human capital investments, job transitions, and the impact of technological change on productivity, worker skills, and outsourcing decisions.

Selected works 

 Bartel, Ann P. "Productivity gains from the implementation of employee training programs." Industrial relations: a journal of economy and society 33, no. 4 (1994): 411–425.
 Bartel, Ann P., and Frank R. Lichtenberg. "The comparative advantage of educated workers in implementing new technology." The Review of Economics and statistics (1987): 1–11.
 Bartel, Ann P. "Where do the new US immigrants live?." Journal of Labor Economics 7, no. 4 (1989): 371–391.
 Bartel, Ann P. "Training, wage growth, and job performance: Evidence from a company database." Journal of Labor Economics 13, no. 3 (1995): 401–425.
 Bartel, Ann, Casey Ichniowski, and Kathryn Shaw. "How does information technology affect productivity? Plant-level comparisons of product innovation, process improvement, and worker skills." The quarterly journal of Economics 122, no. 4 (2007): 1721–1758.

References 

1949 births
21st-century American economists
American women economists
Living people
Columbia Graduate School of Arts and Sciences alumni
University of Pennsylvania alumni
Labor economists
21st-century American women